Raphaël Martinetti is a Swiss businessman and was the president of the International Federation of Associated Wrestling Styles (FILA) from 2002 to 2013. He was elected to this position in 2002, succeeding Milan Ercegan from Yugoslavia. Previously, Martinetti was head of the FILA officiating committee and served on the FILA Bureau for twenty years.

Martinetti resigned as the FILA President at the 15–16 February 2013 meeting of the FILA Executive Committee, after a no confidence vote. The resignation followed the decision by the IOC less than a week earlier to remove wrestling from the list of core olympic sports, that are guaranteed to be represented at the olympics, starting with the 2020 Summer Olympic Games.
The FILA Executive Committee appointed Nenand Lalovic to be an interim FILA President until a new President is elected at a FILA congress.

Raphael Martinetti and his wife have been ordered by the Swiss government to pay tax 5 millions euro sums of money given to the couple in 2010 and 2012 by unnamed persons in Azerbaijan.

References

Swiss businesspeople
Swiss sports executives and administrators
Living people
Year of birth missing (living people)